"Count On Me" is a song written by Don Reid, and recorded by American country music group The Statler Brothers.  It was released in April 1986 as the first single from their album Four for the Show.  The song peaked at number 5 on the Billboard Hot Country Singles chart.

Chart performance

References

1986 singles
1986 songs
The Statler Brothers songs
Mercury Records singles
Songs written by Don Reid (singer)
Song recordings produced by Jerry Kennedy